Jill Sinclair (5 April 1952 – 22 March 2014) was an English businesswoman and former record company director, a founder of ZTT Records and one of the most influential women in pop music. She has been called "One of the most successful people in the British music business".

Career
In 1973, at the age of 21 Sinclair emerged as one of the founders of Sarm Studios with her brother John Sinclair, and sound engineers Mike Stone and Gary Lyons. Sarm soon evolved into one of the most technically advanced recording studios in London – essentially the first 24-track studio – and it attracted major artists, like Queen, who recorded A Night at the Opera and A Day at the Races partially at Sarm studios. Other artists who have recorded in Sarm East include Yes, INXS, The Clash and Madonna.

Sinclair started her career as a mathematics teacher, but started working full-time in Sarm studios in 1977, at the age of 25.

In 1978, Sarm studios started a production company called Sarm Productions led by Sinclair, with records such as "Only Feel This Way" produced by her brother John Sinclair for his band Levinsky/Sinclair being one of their early productions. She also started as the manager of her husband Trevor Horn during the time The Buggles split. She convinced Horn to concentrate on music production, and arranged his first production deals with Dollar and ABC.

In 1982 Sinclair and Horn founded Perfect Songs, a publishing company. Next year, together with NME writer Paul Morley they founded ZTT Records which soon boomed into success. Sinclair became ZTT's managing director, while Paul Morley concentrated on marketing duties. In the same year Sinclair and Horn acquired Basing Street Studios from Island Records in exchange for distributing the ZTT label. The studio was renamed Sarm West Studios.

ZTT's first major signing was Frankie Goes to Hollywood, whose hits "Relax" and "Two Tribes" were among the most influential and best-selling singles of the decade. It was the label's second single, Relax, that became the label's first number one in January 1984. Relax stayed in the Top 75 for a full year and ZTT was well and truly established. During the 1980s also Grace Jones and Art of Noise were ZTT acts to chart. In the early days, the label also helped to shape the very structure and format of pop music (its 12" remixes getting chart positions of their own and its T-shirts becoming the uniform of the 80s) and turned every aspect of the business of pop into entertainment.

in 1984, the Horn-Sinclair family businesses were reorganised as SPZ Group, which then consisted of Sarm studios, Perfect Songs and ZTT records.

The latter part of the decade was eclipsed by the bitter legal battle between ZTT and Holly Johnson who fought his way out of the strict, long recording agreement. Similarly, in disagreement, a few other ZTT artists, like Art of Noise and Propaganda left the label.

In 1987 her brother John moved to Israel to become a rabbi and has not been involved in the Sinclair family's music business since the 1990s. That same year, ZTT purchased the bankrupt Stiff records.

During this time ZTT refocused on the emerging dance music scene. Manchester group 808 State would reach the top 10 with their anthemic song Pacific State and three other singles and one album during early nineties. Seal was the next major ZTT act to emerge in 1990.

Personal life

Sinclair was born in London to a Jewish family. She married music producer Trevor Horn in 1980 and they had four children; two sons, Aaron and William  and two daughters, Gabriella and Alexandra. Aaron (known in the industry as "Aaron Audio"), like his father, is a musician and producer. He was formerly a member of the band Sam and the Womp and frequently DJs around London. Both Aaron and Ally Horn are co-directors of Sarm Studios.

Accident, coma and death
On 25 June 2006, Aaron was practising with his air rifle, not realising his mother was close by. A 4.5 mm (.17 calibre) air gun pellet accidentally hit Sinclair in the neck, severing an artery and causing irreversible brain damage from hypoxia, leaving only her lower brain functions and no chance for recovery. She was taken to the Royal Berkshire Hospital intensive care unit where her condition was described as "critical but stable". Communication from ZTT Records confirmed on 1 September 2006 that Jill was in a natural coma and had been moved to a rehabilitation centre. In September 2009, Horn told The Times that he preferred not to answer questions about his wife, but confirmed that she was still in a coma. In June 2012, Horn told The Sunday Times that his wife was not in a coma, but, "She cannot speak, move, or smile. The only expression she can show is of discomfort." Sinclair died of cancer on 22 March 2014, aged 61.

References

1952 births
2014 deaths
British music industry executives
English Jews
ZTT Records
Deaths from cancer in England
20th-century English businesspeople